Stigmella racemifera is a moth of the family Nepticulidae. It is only known from the Pacific Coast in the Oaxaca region of Mexico.

The habitat consists of secondary forests.

Adults are on wing from November to December.

External links
Taxonomic checklist of Nepticulidae of Mexico, with the description of three new species from the Pacific Coast (Insecta, Lepidoptera)

Nepticulidae
Moths of Central America
Moths described in 2009